Tetramorium smaug is a species of myrmicine ant native to Ambatovy, Amber Mountain National Park, and Ivohibe in Madagascar. It is believed to live in vegetation as opposed to on the forest floor. Coloration is dark brown or black. The head and mesosoma have rough surfaces while the gaster is smooth. The head has a large number of hairs, but the amount of hair decreases on each segment posteriorly. The species has long propodeal spines with a broad base. It was named after the dragon Smaug from J. R. R. Tolkien's novel The Hobbit.

References

External links
 
 
 
 Tetramorium smaug at AntWiki

smaug
Insects of Madagascar
Insects described in 2012
Hymenoptera of Africa
Organisms named after Tolkien and his works